Bangi-dong is a neighbourhood, dong of Songpa-gu, Seoul, South Korea.

Education
Korea National Sport University is located there, next to Olympic Park.

Schools located in Bangi-dong:
 Seoul Bangi Elementary School
 Seoul Bangsan Elementary School
 Bangi Middle School
 Bangsan Middle School
 Bangsan High School

Transportation 
 Bangi station of 
 Olympic Park station of 
 Mongchontoseong station of

See also
Baekje
Olympic Park, Seoul
Administrative divisions of South Korea

References

External links
 Bangi 1-dong resident center website 
 Songpa-gu map

Neighbourhoods of Songpa District